Allora major, the greater peacock awl, is a butterfly of the family Hesperiidae. It is found as several subspecies in New Guinea and adjacent islands, and on Cape York, Australia.

The wingspan is about 40 mm for males and 50 mm for females.

The larvae probably feed on Corynocarpus cribbianus.

Subspecies
Allora major major
Allora major lectra Evans, 1949 (Schouten Island)
Allora major talesia Evans, 1949 (New Britain)

External links
Australian Insects
Australian Faunal Directory

Coeliadinae
Butterflies described in 1915
Butterflies of Australia
Insects of Papua New Guinea